Wayne Robert Ellington Jr. (born November 29, 1987) is an American professional basketball player who last played for the Los Angeles Lakers of the National Basketball Association (NBA). He played for the University of North Carolina from 2006 to 2009. He chose to forgo his final season of college eligibility to declare for the 2009 NBA draft, and was drafted 28th overall by the Minnesota Timberwolves.

High school career
Ellington scored 2,211 points in his high school career, tallying 455 points at Daniel Boone High School, and then 1,756 points at The Episcopal Academy. In his senior year, Ellington averaged 21.9 points, 8.3 rebounds, 3.2 assists and shot 39% from the three-point line. He led Episcopal to an overall record of 52–7 in his junior and senior year, and to the Inter-Academic League Conference title in his last two years going 20–0 in both seasons. (Episcopal doesn't play in state championships.)

Considered a five-star recruit by Rivals.com, Ellington was listed as the No. 1 shooting guard and the No. 8 player in the nation in 2006.

College career

Ellington played in all 38 games for the ACC Champion Tar Heels in 2006–07, averaging 11.7 points per game. He was named to the 2007 ACC All-Tournament Team. His season ended on a sour note though, as North Carolina lost to Georgetown in the East Regional final of the NCAA Tournament. He had a chance to win the game in regulation, but missed a 3-pointer in the final seconds. Ellington was a member of the U.S. national team that finished fifth at the 2007 Pan American Games.

As a sophomore, Ellington saw his points-per-game average increase as the Tar Heels increasingly went to him in key moments of games. In the January 6, 2008 game at Clemson, Ellington scored a career high 36 points, including the game winning three-pointer with 0:00.4 seconds left in overtime to lead top-rated UNC over #19 Clemson 90–88. But again, his season ended in a poor fashion, as he shot only 1 for 9 from three-point range, in a loss to Kansas in a national semifinal game in the NCAA Tournament. He declared for the 2008 NBA draft after that season, but did not hire an agent, and withdrew to play his junior year at North Carolina.

As a Junior, Ellington helped lead the Tar Heels to the National Championship, where they defeated the Michigan State Spartans 89–72. He shot 7–10 from three-point range in the Final Four, and he was named to the All-Tournament Team and was named NCAA basketball tournament Most Outstanding Player. During his college career, Ellington averaged 14.7 points, 4.1 rebounds and 2.2 assists per game.

On April 23, 2009, Ellington announced that he would forgo his senior season and enter the NBA draft.

Professional career

Minnesota Timberwolves (2009–2012)

Ellington was drafted 28th overall by the Minnesota Timberwolves in the 2009 NBA draft. He averaged 6.6 points per game and 2.1 rebounds per game in his rookie season off of the bench.

Memphis Grizzlies (2012–2013)
On July 24, 2012, Ellington was traded to the Memphis Grizzlies for forward Dante Cunningham.

On November 11, 2012, Ellington scored a career-high 25 points on 7-of-11 three-pointers in a 104–96 win over the Miami Heat. On January 7, 2013, he set a new career high with 26 points in a 113–81 win over the Sacramento Kings.

Cleveland Cavaliers (2013)
On January 22, 2013, Ellington was traded to the Cleveland Cavaliers along with Marreese Speights, Josh Selby and a future first round draft pick for forward Jon Leuer.

Dallas Mavericks (2013–2014)
On July 26, 2013, Ellington signed with the Dallas Mavericks.

Los Angeles Lakers (2014–2015)
On June 25, 2014, Ellington, along with Shane Larkin, José Calderón, Samuel Dalembert and two 2014 second-round picks, was traded to the New York Knicks in exchange for Tyson Chandler and Raymond Felton. On August 6, 2014, he was traded again, this time to the Sacramento Kings, along with Jeremy Tyler and a 2016 second round pick, in exchange for Quincy Acy and Travis Outlaw. On September 3, 2014, he was waived by the Kings.

On September 22, 2014, Ellington signed with the Los Angeles Lakers. On November 11, 2014, he took an indefinite leave of absence from the Lakers after his father was shot and killed in Philadelphia. He returned to action on November 21, 2014. On January 27, 2015, he scored a career-high 28 points in a 98–92 loss to the Washington Wizards. He finished the season having played 65 games after being ruled out for the rest of the season on April 2, 2015 with a shoulder injury.

Brooklyn Nets (2015–2016)
On July 10, 2015, Ellington signed with the Brooklyn Nets. On December 28, 2015, he scored a season-high 26 points and tied a career high with seven made three-pointers in a 111–105 win over the Miami Heat. On April 27, 2016, Ellington was named recipient of the 2015–16 J. Walter Kennedy Citizenship Award as selected by the Pro Basketball Writers Association (PBWA).

Miami Heat (2016–2019)
On July 10, 2016, Ellington signed with the Miami Heat. He made his debut for the Heat on November 28, 2016 against the Boston Celtics after missing the first 16 games of the season with a bruised thigh; he played 27 minutes and scored nine points.

On December 22, 2017, Ellington tied a career high with 28 points and had a career-high eight 3-pointers in a 113–101 win over the Dallas Mavericks. On March 21, 2018, in a 119–98 win over the New York Knicks, Ellington hit his 200th 3-pointer of the season, making him the third Heat player with that many in a season, joining Damon Jones (225) and Tim Hardaway Sr. (203). In the Heat's regular season finale on April 11, 2018, Ellington scored a career-high 32 points while setting Miami's single-season record for 3-pointers, as the Heat wrapped up the No. 6 seed in the Eastern Conference playoffs by beating the Toronto Raptors 116–109 in overtime. Ellington needed six 3-pointers in the finale to beat the record of 225 that Jones set in the 2004–05 season. He finished the season with 227.

On July 13, 2018, Ellington re-signed with the Heat.

On February 6, 2019, Ellington was traded, along with Tyler Johnson, to the Phoenix Suns in exchange for Ryan Anderson. He was waived by the Suns the following day.

Detroit Pistons (2019)
On February 9, 2019, Ellington signed with the Detroit Pistons.

New York Knicks (2019–2020)
On July 9, 2019, Ellington signed with the New York Knicks. He made his debut for the team on October 23, 2019, scoring three points in a 111–120 loss to the San Antonio Spurs. On February 8, 2020, Ellington logged a season-high 17 points, alongside five rebounds and three assists, in a 95–92 win over the Detroit Pistons.

On November 19, 2020, the Knicks waived Ellington.

Return to the Pistons (2020–2021)
On December 2, 2020, Ellington signed with the Pistons. On March 3, 2021, he scored a season-high 25 points, alongside two steals, in a 129–105 win over the Toronto Raptors.

Return to the Lakers (2021–2022)
On August 6, 2021, Ellington signed with the Los Angeles Lakers. On April 10, 2022, he scored a season-high 18 points in a 146–141 overtime win over the Denver Nuggets.

Career statistics

NBA

Regular season

|-
| style="text-align:left;"|
| style="text-align:left;"|Minnesota
| 76|| 1 || 18.2 || .424 || .395 || .871 || 2.1 || 1.0 || .3 || .1 || 6.6
|-
| style="text-align:left;"|
| style="text-align:left;"|Minnesota
| 62 || 8 || 19.0 || .403 || .397 || .792 || 1.7 || 1.2 || .5 || .0 || 6.6
|-
| style="text-align:left;"|
| style="text-align:left;"|Minnesota
| 51 || 4 || 19.1 || .404 || .324 || .800 || 1.9 || .6 || .5 || .2 || 6.1
|-
| style="text-align:left;"|
| style="text-align:left;"|Memphis
| 40 || 4 || 16.9 || .407 || .423 || .938 || 1.3 || 1.1 || .4 || .0 || 5.5
|-
| style="text-align:left;"|
| style="text-align:left;"|Cleveland
| 38 || 17 || 25.9 || .439 || .371 || .898 || 3.0 || 1.6 || .8 || .1 || 10.4
|-
| style="text-align:left;"|
| style="text-align:left;"|Dallas
| 45 || 1 || 8.7 || .437 || .424 || .909 || 1.0 || .4 || .4 || .0 || 3.2
|-
| style="text-align:left;"|
| style="text-align:left;"|L.A. Lakers
| 65 || 36 || 25.8 || .412 || .370 || .813 || 3.2 || 1.6 || .5 || .0 || 10.0
|-
| style="text-align:left;"|
| style="text-align:left;"|Brooklyn
| 76|| 41 || 21.3 || .389 || .358 || .857 || 2.3 || 1.1 || .6 || .1 || 7.7
|-
| style="text-align:left;"|
| style="text-align:left;"|Miami
| 62 || 13 || 24.2 || .416 || .378 || .860 || 2.1 || 1.1 || .6 || .1 || 10.5
|-
| style="text-align:left;"|
| style="text-align:left;"|Miami
| 77 || 2 || 26.5 || .407 || .392 || .859 || 2.8 || 1.0 || .7 || .1 || 11.2
|-
| style="text-align:left;"|
| style="text-align:left;"|Miami
| 25 || 12 || 21.3 || .375 || .368 || .875 || 1.9 || 1.2 || 1.0 || .1 || 8.4
|-
| style="text-align:left;"|
| style="text-align:left;"|Detroit
| 28 || 26 || 27.3 || .421 || .373 || .758 || 2.1 || 1.5 || 1.1 || .1 || 12.0
|-
| style="text-align:left;"|
| style="text-align:left;"|New York
| 36 || 1 || 15.5 || .351 || .350 || .846 || 1.8 || 1.2 || .4 || .1 || 5.1
|-
| style="text-align:left;"| 
| style="text-align:left;"| Detroit
| 46 || 31 || 22.0 || .441 || .422 || .800 || 1.8 || 1.5 || .4 || .2 || 9.6
|-
| style="text-align:left;"| 
| style="text-align:left;"| L.A. Lakers
| 43 || 9 || 18.8 || .414 || .389 || .818 || 1.8 || .7 || .5 || .1 || 6.7
|- class="sortbottom"
| style="text-align:center;" colspan="2"| Career
| 770 || 206 || 20.9 || .410 || .382 || .843 || 2.1 || 1.1 || .5 || .1 || 8.0

Playoffs

|-
| style="text-align:left;"|2014
| style="text-align:left;"|Dallas
| 2 || 0 || 7.0 || .333 || .333 || 1.000 || 1.0 || 1.0 || .0 || .0 || 4.0
|-
| style="text-align:left;"|2018
| style="text-align:left;"|Miami
| 5 || 0 || 20.2 || .343 || .400 || 1.000 || 1.6 || .6 || .4 || .4 || 7.8
|-
| style="text-align:left;"|2019
| style="text-align:left;"|Detroit
| 4 || 4 || 32.8 || .314 || .318 || 1.000 || 3.8 || 1.3 || .8 || .0 || 7.8
|- class="sortbottom"
| style="text-align:center;" colspan="2"|Career
| 11 || 4 || 22.4 || .329 || .362 || 1.000 || 2.3 || .9 || .5 || .2 || 7.1

College

|-
| style="text-align:left;"|2006–07
| style="text-align:left;"|North Carolina
| 38 || 37 || 23.9 || .433 || .371 || .836 || 2.9 || 2.1 || .8 || .0 || 11.7
|-
| style="text-align:left;"|2007–08
| style="text-align:left;"|North Carolina
| 39 || 38 || 31.1 || .467 || .400 || .826 || 4.5 || 2.0 || 1.1 || .2 || 16.6
|-
| style="text-align:left;"|2008–09
| style="text-align:left;"|North Carolina
| 38 || 37 || 30.4 || .483 || .417 || .777 || 4.9 || 2.7 || .9 || .2 || 15.8
|- class="sortbottom"
| style="text-align:center;" colspan="2"|Career
| 115 || 112 || 28.5 || .463 || .397 || .809 || 4.1 || 2.2 || .9 || .1 || 14.7

See also

2006 high school boys basketball All-Americans

References

External links

 North Carolina Tar Heels bio

1987 births
Living people
African-American basketball players
American men's basketball players
Basketball players at the 2007 Pan American Games
Basketball players from Pennsylvania
Brooklyn Nets players
Cleveland Cavaliers players
Dallas Mavericks players
Detroit Pistons players
Episcopal Academy alumni
Los Angeles Lakers players
McDonald's High School All-Americans
Memphis Grizzlies players
Miami Heat players
Minnesota Timberwolves draft picks
Minnesota Timberwolves players
New York Knicks players
North Carolina Tar Heels men's basketball players
Parade High School All-Americans (boys' basketball)
People from Lower Merion Township, Pennsylvania
Shooting guards
Sportspeople from the Delaware Valley
Sportspeople from Montgomery County, Pennsylvania
Pan American Games competitors for the United States
21st-century African-American sportspeople
20th-century African-American people